Hokejsko drsalno društvo Olimpija Ljubljana, commonly referred to as HDD Olimpija or simply Olimpija, was a Slovenian professional ice hockey club from Ljubljana. They played their home games at the Tivoli Hall. Olimpija has won 13 Yugoslav championships and 15 Slovenian championships. They won ten consecutive titles between 1995 and 2004.

History
The club was founded in 1928 as SK Ilirija. It was the first club on the territory of Yugoslavia to play organized ice hockey under the Canadian rules. In the 2007–08 season, their first in Erste Bank Eishockey Liga, they made it all the way to the Finals, but lost 4 games to 2 against EC Red Bull Salzburg. Following the 2016–17 season, the club was dissolved due to financial debt.

Club names through history
 SK Ilrija (1928–1941)
 HK Udarnik (1946)
 HK Triglav (1947)
 HK Enotnost (1948)
 HK Ljubljana (1949–1961)
 HK Olimpija (1962–1985)
 HK Olimpija Kompas  (1985–1991)
 HK Olimpija Hertz  (1991–1998)
 HK Olimpija  (1999–2002)
 HDD Zavarovalnica Maribor Olimpija  (2002–2008)
 HDD Tilia Olimpija  (2008–2012)
 HDD Telemach Olimpija  (2012–2016)
 HDD Olimpija  (2016–2017)

Arena
The team played their home matches at the Tivoli Hall complex, a 7,000 all-seated ice hockey indoor hall in Ljubljana.

Honours

Austrian Hockey League
 Runners-up (1): 2007–08

Yugoslav Ice Hockey League (until 1991)
Winners (13): 1936–37, 1937–38, 1938–39, 1939–40, 1940–41, 1971–72, 1973–74, 1974–75, 1975–76, 1978–79, 1979–80, 1982–83, 1983–84
Runners-up (13): 1947–48, 1957–58, 1958–59, 1964–65, 1969–70, 1970–71, 1972–73, 1976–77, 1977–78, 1980–81, 1981–82, 1987–88, 1990–91

Yugoslav Ice Hockey Cup (until 1991)
Winners (4): 1969, 1972, 1975, 1987

Slovenian Championship
Winners (15): 1994–95, 1995–96, 1996–97, 1997–98, 1998–99, 1999–2000, 2000–01, 2001–02, 2002–03, 2003–04, 2006–07, 2011–12, 2012–13, 2013–14, 2015–16
Runners-up (10): 1991–92, 1992–93, 1993–94, 2004–05, 2007–08, 2008–09, 2009–10, 2010–11, 2014–15, 2016–17

Slovenian Ice Hockey Cup
Winners (4): 1993–94, 1995–96, 2000, 2015–16

Slovenian Ice Hockey Supercup
Winners (2): 1998–99, 2016–17

Interliga
Winners (2): 2000–01, 2001–02

Alpenliga
Runners-up (1): 1996–97

IIHF Federation Cup
Third place (1): 1995

Karawankencup
Winners (4): 1972–73, 1973–74, 1974–75, 1978–79

Alpencup
Winners (1): 1971–72

Rudi Hiti Summer League
Winners (3): 2000, 2002, 2004

Team captains (since 1988)
  Srdan Kuret, 1988–1991
  Igor Beribak, 1991–2002
  Peter Rožič, 2002–2003
  Ildar Rahmatullin, 2003–04
  Damjan Dervarič, 2004–05
  Mitja Šivic, 2005–06
  Robert Ciglenečki, 2006–07  Tomaž Vnuk, 2007–09
  Kevin Mitchell, 2009–10
  Jurij Goličič, 2010
  Žiga Pance, 2010–12
  Aleš Mušič, 2012–2017
  Aleš Mušič and  Andrej Tavželj (co-captains), 2015

Former NHL players
  Jan Muršak
  John Smrke
  Neil Sheehy
  Steve Bozek
  Brian MacLellan
  Colin Patterson
  Alain Côté
  Kimbi Daniels
   Ed Kastelic
  Kraig Nienhuis
  David Haas
  Bill McDougall
  Len Hachborn
  Jason Lafreniere
  Kim Issel
  Pat Murray
  Yves Héroux
  Lonnie Loach
  Jean-Francois Quintin
  Mike Tomlak  Chris Corrinet
  Manny Malhotra
  Brian Willsie
  Matt Pettinger
  John Jakopin
  Ryan Jardine
   Greg Kuznik
  Ralph Intranuovo
  Brian Felsner
  Todd Elik
  Frank Banham
  Mike Morrison
  Norm Maracle
  Remi Royer
  Steve Kelly
  Matt Higgins
  Travis Brigley
  Burke Henry
  Kari Haakana
  Norm Maracle

Head coaches (since 1989)
  Nikolai Ladygin, 1989–1990
  Alexander Astashev, 1990–1991
  Štefan Seme, 1991–1992
  Peter Janoš, 1992–1993
  Brad Buetow, 1993–1994
  Pavle Kavčič, 1994–1995, 1995–1996, 1996–1997
  Matjaž Sekelj, 1997–1998, 1998–1999
  Bud Stefanski, 1998–1999
  Matjaž Sekelj, 1999–2000
  Marjan Gorenc, 2000–2001, 2001–2002
  Chris Imes, 2002–2003
  Matjaž Sekelj, 2003–2004, 2004–2005  Andrej Brodnik, 2005–2006
  Ildar Rahmatullin, 2006–2007, 2007–2008
  Mike Posma, 2007–2008, 2008–2009
  Randy Edmonds, 2008–2009
  Bojan Zajc, 2008–2009
   Dany Gelinas, 2009–2010
  Hannu Järvenpää, 2009–2012
  Heikki Mälkiä, 2012–2012
  Bojan Zajc, 2012–2014
  Ivo Jan, 2014
  Fabian Dahlem, 2014–2016
  Bojan Zajc, 2016–2017

Retired numbers
 24 – Tomaž Vnuk, C, 1987–2009

References

External links

 
Ice hockey clubs established in 1928
Ice hockey clubs disestablished in 2017
Defunct ice hockey teams in Slovenia
Sports clubs in Ljubljana
Slovenian Ice Hockey League teams
Former Austrian Hockey League teams
Yugoslav Ice Hockey League teams
Interliga (1999–2007) teams
Alpenliga teams
1928 establishments in Slovenia
2017 disestablishments in Slovenia